Pterostylis agrestis is a plant in the orchid family Orchidaceae and is endemic to Victoria. It has a rosette of leaves and when flowering, up to fourteen transparent green flowers with a blunt, greenish-black appendage on the labellum. It is similar to the black-tip greenhood, Pterostylis bicolor but that species has larger, less crowded flowers and is found in different habitats.

Description
Pterostylis agrestis, is a terrestrial,  perennial, deciduous, herb with an underground tuber. When flowering there are between three and fourteen crowded, translucent green flowers with darker green lines. The dorsal sepal and petals form a hood over the column. Flowering occurs from September to October.

Taxonomy and naming
This orchid was first formally described in 2009 by David Jones who gave it the name Hymenochilus agrestis from a specimen collected near Sutton Grange. The description was published in The Orchadian. In 2010, Gary Backhouse changed the name to Pterostylis agrestis. The specific epithet (agrestis) is a Latin word  meaning "land", "rural" or "wild ".

Distribution and habitat
This greenhood is poorly known but has been recorded in grassland near Bacchus Marsh, Maldon, Sutton Grange and Taradale in central Victoria. Pterostylis bicolor is similar but generally found in woodland or coastal scrub.

References

agrestis
Endemic orchids of Australia
Orchids of Victoria (Australia)
Plants described in 2009